DSV A/S is a Danish transport and logistics company offering transport services globally by road, air, sea and train. Since its foundation in 1976 by nine independent Danish hauliers, the company has achieved rapid expansion and international presence, predominantly through a series of strategic competitor acquisitions, some of the most important ones being Samson Transport (1997), DFDS Dan Transport Group (2000), J.H.Bachmann (2004), Frans Maas (2006), ABX LOGISTICS (2008) and UTi Worldwide, Inc. in 2016. In April 2019, DSV signed an agreement to acquire Panalpina Welttransport (Holding) AG and the deal was closed in August 2019.

With headquarters in Hedehusene (near Copenhagen), Denmark, and offices in more than 80 countries, DSV employs 56,000 people and collaborates with partners and agents globally. The company is listed on NASDAQ OMX Copenhagen (Copenhagen Stock Exchange) and included in the OMXC25 index as one of the 25 most traded stocks.

The company is structured in three divisions, Road, Air & Sea, and Solutions. Its main activities lie within road transport (trucking) networks in Europe, North America and South Africa, and its global air and sea freight forwarding business. The group also has a growing contract logistics business. As part of an asset-light financial strategy to maintain fixed costs at a minimum and be able to quickly respond to market fluctuations, the group does not own any ships or aeroplanes and only a relatively small number of trucks and trailers.

Jens Bjørn Andersen became CEO in August 2008. In 2020, the company reported a net revenue of DKKm 115,932.

History
In 1976, Leif Tullberg and nine independent haulers established DSV, an initialism for “De Sammensluttede Vognmænd af 13-7 1976 A/S” (The Joint Hauliers of 13-7 1976). Leif Tullberg remained CEO until his retirement in 2005.

He was succeeded by Kurt Larsen who became Chairman of the Board of Directors in 2008 when Jens Bjørn Andersen took over as CEO.

During the first decade the company mainly functioned as a cartage department for the owners, handling contracting haulage and deliveries.

Seeking a foothold on the international market, DSV bought two competing export companies in 1989, Borup Autotransport A/S and Hammerbro A/S-Bech Trans. The next acquisitions on the road to becoming Pan-European were Samson Transport Co. A/S in 1997 and Svex Group A/S in 1999.

The purchase of the DFDS Dan Transport Group in 2000 provided DSV with important road transport activities in Scandinavia, the UK, several Mainland European countries and the Baltics plus a global network including a logistics set-up. The purchase of J.H. Bachmann in 2005 reinforced the company's position within international air and sea transport.

The acquisition of the Dutch Frans Maas Group in 2006 placed DSV as a truly Pan-European road transport and logistics supplier – and one of the three largest in Europe. With the acquisition of ABX LOGISTICS in 2008, DSV got a foothold in South America and is now represented on six continents. With the acquisition of UTi Worldwide, Inc. in 2016 and Panalpina Welttransport (Holding) AG in 2019, the company became one of the world's four largest transport and logistics companies).

On 1 April 2019, an acquisition agreement with Swiss Panalpina was announced valued at CHF 4.6 billion (€ 4.1 billion). On 19 August 2019, DSV announced that the acquisition of Panalpina was completed.

On 2 July 2020, DSV plans to invest approx. DKK2bn in a new logistics centre near Horsens, Europe’s largest with just one leaseholder.

On 27 April 2021, DSV announce its plans to acquire "Agility Global Integrated Logistics (GIL)".

Company name
When in 2000 DSV A/S acquired DFDS Dan Transport Group A/S, the new joint company's activities continued under the DFDS Transport name, while the parent company remained De Sammensluttede Vognmænd (In English: The joint Hauliers) af 13-7 1976 A/S. In 2003, it was formally shortened to DSV A/S.

In 2007, the name of the company's transport activities were also changed to DSV, to create a global brand and avoid confusion.

On 24 September 2019, at an Extraordinary General Meeting, it was decided to change the company name from DSV A/S to DSV Panalpina A/S while maintaining DSV A/S as a second name. The name change only applies to the parent company. The DSV logo will remain unchanged.

On 8 September 2021 the name of parent company, DSV Panalpina A/S, has been changed back to DSV A/S.

References

External links 
 

Companies listed on Nasdaq Copenhagen
Logistics companies of Denmark
Transport companies based in Copenhagen
Companies based in Brøndby Municipality
Danish companies established in 1976
Danish brands